Phreatia crassiuscula, commonly known as the green caterpillar orchid, is a plant in the orchid family and is an epiphyte or lithophyte with three to six fleshy, channelled leaves in a fan-like arrangement. Up to sixty tiny white, cream-coloured or greenish flowers are arranged along a curved flowering stem. It is endemic to tropical North Queensland.

Description
Flowering occurs between January and April.

Taxonomy and naming
Phreatia crassiuscula was first formally described in 1945 by William Henry Nicholls who published the description in The Victorian Naturalist from a specimen collected on Mount Bartle Frere by Alf Glindeman. Nicholls noted that there were specimens of the same species in Ferdinand von Mueller's herbarium and that Mueller had named Oberonia crassiuscula. Nicholls described the epithet crassiuscula "an eminently fitting one, referring as it does to its salient characteristic, namely, the thick fleshy Crassula-like foliage".

Distribution and habitat
The green caterpillar orchid usually grows on mossy rainforest trees between the Cedar Bay and Paluma Range National Parks.

References

crassiuscula
Plants described in 1945
Orchids of Queensland
Endemic orchids of Australia